Yaovi Akakpo is a Togolese professional footballer who plays as a winger for Gabala in the Azerbaijan Premier League.

Career

Club
On 20 February 2020, Akakpo signed 2.5 years contract with Gabala FK.

On 22 February 2020, Akakpo made his debut in the Azerbaijan Premier League for Gabala match against Neftçi Baku.

On 22 May 2022, Gabala announced that Akakpo had signed a new one-year contract with the club.

Career statistics

Club

References

External links
 

1999 births
Living people
Association football midfielders
Togolese footballers
Togolese expatriate footballers
Togolese expatriate sportspeople in Azerbaijan
Expatriate footballers in Azerbaijan
Azerbaijan Premier League players
Gabala FC players
21st-century Togolese people